The 1959 World Table Tennis Championships were held in Dortmund from March 27 to April 5, 1959.

Medalists

Team

Individual

References

External links
ITTF Museum

 
World Table Tennis Championships
World Table Tennis Championships
World Table Tennis Championships
International sports competitions hosted by West Germany
Table tennis competitions in Germany
World Table Tennis Championships
World Table Tennis Championships
20th century in Dortmund
Sports competitions in Dortmund
1950s in North Rhine-Westphalia